Burton A. Boutin is a professional poker player from Henderson, Nevada who has won two World Series of Poker bracelets. He also finished in second place at the 2006 Mandalay Bay Poker Championship winning $604,765. Boutin is known for drinking "Red Bull" at the poker table and acting a little hyper between hands.  During the final table of the 2007 WSOP $5,000 Pot Limit Omaha event, WSOP commentator Norman Chad referred to him as "Red Bull Burt".

During the 2001 World Series of Poker $2,000 Pot Limit Hold'em event, Boutin won his first bracelet after he had defeated Dave Ulliott heads-up. When he won his second bracelet in 2007, Ulliott was again at the final table, this time finishing third.

Burt can be found in Las Vegas playing a variety of poker games from 200NL to 2000NL as well as mixed games.

As of 2009, Boutin's total live tournament winnings exceed $2,200,000. His 15 cashes at the WSOP account for $1,308,253 of those winnings.

Boutin has three children.

World Series of Poker bracelets

References

Year of birth missing (living people)
Living people
American poker players
World Series of Poker bracelet winners